Tyler Tennant McGill (born August 18, 1987) is an American former competition swimmer who is a butterfly specialist and has been a member of two world champion relay teams from the United States.  He was a member of the 2012 United States Olympic Team and earned a gold medal as a member of the winning U.S. team in the 4×100-meter medley relay at the 2012 Summer Olympics.

Career
McGill attended Champaign Central High School in Champaign, Illinois.
McGill attended Auburn University, and competed for the Auburn Tigers swimming and diving team under head coach Brett Hawke from 2007 to 2010.  During his four years of college swimming, he won NCAA championships in the 400-yard freestyle and the 4×100-yard medley relay, and an SEC championship in the 800-yard freestyle.

At the 2009 U.S. Nationals and World Championship Trials, McGill placed second to Michael Phelps in the 100-meter butterfly with a time of 51.06, earning a place to compete at the 2009 World Aquatics Championships in Rome. At the World Championships, McGill placed seventh in the 100-meter butterfly with a time of 51.42. He also competed in the 50-meter butterfly and placed 36th in 23.93. McGill swam in the preliminaries of the 4×100-meter medley relay for the U.S. team, which advanced to the final and won the gold medal.

At the 2011 World Aquatics Championships in Shanghai, China, McGill won a bronze medal in the 100-meter butterfly, finishing behind Michael Phelps and Konrad Czerniak. On the last day of competition, McGill won a gold medal in the 4×100-meter medley relay for his contributions in the heats.

At the 2012 U.S. Olympic Trials in Omaha, Nebraska, the qualifying meet for the U.S. Olympic team, McGill placed second in the 100-meter butterfly event with a time of 51.32 seconds, just behind Michael Phelps and just ahead of Ryan Lochte.  At the 2012 Summer Olympics in London, McGill placed sixth the 100-meter butterfly, and earned a gold medal by swimming in the preliminaries for the winning U.S. team in the 4×100-meter medley relay.

See also

 Auburn Tigers
 List of Auburn University people
 List of Olympic medalists in swimming (men)
 List of United States records in swimming
 List of World Aquatics Championships medalists in swimming (men)

References

External links
  (archive)
 
 
 
 
 
 Tyler McGill – Auburn University athlete profile at AuburnTigers.com

1987 births
Living people
American male butterfly swimmers
Auburn Tigers men's swimmers
Medalists at the 2012 Summer Olympics
Olympic gold medalists for the United States in swimming
Sportspeople from Champaign, Illinois
Swimmers at the 2012 Summer Olympics
World Aquatics Championships medalists in swimming
20th-century American people
21st-century American people